Kızılkaya ("redrock") is a Turkish name that may refer to:

Places in Turkey
 Kızılkaya, Burdur, a town in the district of Bucak, Burdur Province
 Kızılkaya, Besni, a village in the district of Besni, Adıyaman Province
 Kızılkaya, Gülağaç, a village in the district of Gülağaç, Aksaray Province
 Kızılkaya, Gülşehir, a village in the district of Gülşehir, Nevşehir Province
 Kızılkaya, Kalecik, a village in the district of Kalecik, Ankara Province
 Kızılkaya, Koçarlı, a village in the district of Koçarlı, Aydın Province
 Kızılkaya, Toroslar, a village in the district of Toroslar, Mersin Province

Surname
 Elif Kızılkaya (born 1991), Turkish female curler

Turkish-language surnames